"Filthy Mind" is a song recorded by English singer-songwriter Amanda Ghost from her debut studio album Ghost Stories (2000). In the United States, it was released as the lead single from the album on 30 May 2000 by Warner Bros., with "Idol" being the lead single in the United Kingdom. Written and produced by Ghost and Lukas Burton, "Filthy Mind" is an electronic dance song with elements of trance and techno music.

"Filthy Mind" received positive reviews from music critics. In the United States, the song failed to enter the Billboard Hot 100, but was successful in the Dance Club Songs chart where it peaked at number five. The song also received heavy airplay on the alternative music station, WMAD 92.1, in Madison, WI, reaching #1 on their charts for several weeks in August 2000.

The accompanying music video for the "Filthy Mind" was directed by Sean Ellis. The song was featured in films such as Valentine (2001), 40 Days and 40 Nights (2002), and the television series Queer as Folk.

Track listings and formats

CD single
 "Filthy Mind" – 3:57
 "Filthy Mind" (Wicked Child Mix) – 4:21
 "Filthy Mind" (Peter Rauhofer Club Mix) – 9:44
 "Filthy Mind" (Mount Rushmore Extended Mix) – 6:10
 "Filthy Mind" (Boy George & Kinky Roland Trancesexual Mix) – 6:25
 "Filthy Mind" (Peter Rauhofer Dub Mix) – 8:33
 "Filthy Mind" (Video)

Credits and personnel

 Amanda Ghost – vocals, songwriting, producer
 Lukas Burton – producer, music programming
 Nick Sykes – audio engineering

Charts

Release history

References

1999 songs
2000 singles
Amanda Ghost songs
Songs written by Amanda Ghost
Songs written by Lukas Burton